Thomas Kennedy House may refer to:

Thomas Kennedy House (Carlisle, Kentucky), listed on the National Register of Historic Places in Nicholas County, Kentucky
Thomas Kennedy House (Paris, Kentucky), listed on the National Register of Historic Places in Bourbon County, Kentucky

See also
Kennedy House (disambiguation)